New Century Library is a Nanjing-based theoretical journal of library science and information science for the whole China, published monthly and located at No. 189, Zhongshan East Road, Nanjing.

The editor-in-chief of the New Century Library is Xu Xiaoyue.

History
Founded	in 1980, New Century Library is supervised by the Department of Culture and Tourism of Jiangsu Province, and was organized by the Jiangsu Society for Library Science and Nanjing Library.

References

Library and information science journals
Publications established in 1980
Chinese-language journals
1980 establishments in China